2 Foreigners In Bollywood is a comedy group known from social media based in Mumbai, India. The group consists of the three members Johan Bartoli, Hampus Bergqvist and Vidhan Pratap Singh (Rewa).Vidhan belongs to baharadi village in rewa district of Madhya Pradesh. Johan and Hampus both come from Stockholm, Sweden, and moved to India in September 2015 to work as actors in the Hindi Film Industry after completing their education in business school. They both were fond of cinema from different parts of the world.

The comedy group are best known for their Facebook page and YouTube channel '2 Foreigners In Bollywood' where they upload comedy videos. Their video content is about cultural clashes and every day situations in India.

In June 2017, 2 Foreigners In Bollywood was the most viewed original video content page on Facebook India with over 70 million views in that month. Their Facebook page has 3.5 million followers (as of October 2017).

References

External links
 Facebook page
 Youtube channel

YouTube channels launched in 2015
Swedish comedy duos
Indian comedy duos
Comedy troupes
Indian comedians
Comedy YouTubers